Newport Pagnell railway station was a railway station that served  Newport Pagnell, Buckinghamshire, on the Wolverton–Newport Pagnell line. Opened in 1867 the station consisted of a brick built station building, and extensive goods facilities.

The last passenger train ran on 5 September 1964 and the last goods train on 22 May 1967. The station site is now under Sheppard's Close, a modern residential development. The trackbed is now a rail trail, part of the Milton Keynes redway system. There is commemorative column on the site of the final signal post just short of the station site.

Motive Power Depot
The London and North Western Railway opened a small motive power depot at the south side of the line near the  station in 1886. This was closed 15 June 1955 and demolished.

See also

References

External links 
 The station and goods yard (marked 'Wharf') on 1952 six-inch-scale O. S. map (National Library of Scotland)
Plan of the station's layout

Disused railway stations in Buckinghamshire
Former London and North Western Railway stations
Railway stations in Great Britain opened in 1867
Railway stations in Great Britain closed in 1964
Beeching closures in England
Railway stations in Milton Keynes